Chris Anthony Lansdowne, born Christine D'Antonio, is an American voice actress best known as host of Focus on the Family's Adventures in Odyssey and, along with Katie Leigh, is the only remaining original cast member of the show.

Career 
As host of Adventures in Odyssey for over three decades, she is heard weekly on more than 2,000 radio stations worldwide. Aside from her work in radio drama, video games, animation, and TV/radio commercials, Anthony is also known for having voiced more than 100 Mattel talking Barbie games, toys, dolls, and button sound books, from 1994 to 2006.

Anthony has been the host of Adventures in Odyssey since it was started in 1987, and has also played several characters in the series. She was in the Adventures in Odyssey video series for A Flight to the Finish and Star Quest. Other radio drama work includes the role of Ronda in the children's radio drama Jungle Jam and Friends: The Radio Show! and Marsha in Paws & Tales.

Filmography

Film

Television

Video games

References

External links

Official Facebook Page

American voice actresses
Living people
People from Aliquippa, Pennsylvania
Actresses from Pennsylvania
1957 births
21st-century American actresses